The Deli Bank; was the first Chinese bank in Indonesia. It was founded in Medan, Indonesia, in 1907 by the Tjong brothers, Tjong A Fie, (1860-1921) and Tjong Yong Hian (1850-1911), Mandarin capitalists from Mei Hsien, Guangdong, China, who had come over originally to recruit and supply Chinese coolies for plantation workers. Also involved at this time were Cheong Fatt Tze who had entered the region from China, through Indonesia where he built his fortune but who was by that time, Vice-Consul for China, in Penang. Hsieh Yung-kuan was the fourth founding director of the bank.

References

See also
 A plantation city on the east coast of Sumatra 1870-1942 (Planters, the Sultan, Chinese and the Indian) by Dirk A. Buiskool; presented at The 1st International Urban Conference, Surabaya, 23rd-25th 2004, Medan
 Kapitalisme, Golongan Menengah dan Negara: Sebuah Catatan Penelitian (1)
 Kapitalisme, Golongan Menengah dan Negara: Sebuah Catatan Penelitian (2)

Banks of Indonesia
Banks established in 1907